

Events

Pre-1600
217 BC – Battle of Raphia: Ptolemy IV Philopator of Egypt defeats Antiochus III the Great of the Seleucid kingdom.
168 BC – Battle of Pydna: Romans under Lucius Aemilius Paullus defeat Macedonian King Perseus who surrenders after the battle, ending the Third Macedonian War.
 813 – Battle of Versinikia: The Bulgars led by Krum defeat the Byzantine army near Edirne. Emperor Michael I is forced to abdicate in favor of Leo V the Armenian.
 910 – The Hungarians defeat the East Frankish army near the Rednitz River, killing its leader Gebhard, Duke of Lotharingia (Lorraine). 
1527 – Fatahillah expels Portuguese forces from Sunda Kelapa, now regarded as the foundation of Jakarta.
1593 – Battle of Sisak: Allied Christian troops defeat the Ottomans.

1601–1900
1633 – The Holy Office in Rome forces Galileo Galilei to recant his view that the Sun, not the Earth, is the center of the Universe in the form he presented it in, after heated controversy.
1774 – The British pass the Quebec Act, setting out rules of governance for the colony of Quebec in British North America.
1783 – A poisonous cloud caused by the eruption of the Laki volcano in Iceland reaches Le Havre in France.
1807 – In the Chesapeake–Leopard affair, the British warship  attacks and boards the American frigate .
1813 – War of 1812: After learning of American plans for a surprise attack on Beaver Dams in Ontario, Laura Secord sets out on a 30 kilometer journey on foot to warn Lieutenant James FitzGibbon.
1839 – Cherokee leaders Major Ridge, John Ridge, and Elias Boudinot are assassinated for signing the Treaty of New Echota, which had resulted in the Trail of Tears.
1870 – The United States Department of Justice is created by the U.S. Congress.
1893 – The Royal Navy battleship  accidentally rams the British Mediterranean Fleet flagship  which sinks taking 358 crew with her, including the fleet's commander, Vice-Admiral Sir George Tryon.
1897 – British colonial officers Charles Walter Rand and Lt. Charles Egerton Ayerst are assassinated in Pune, Maharashtra, India by the Chapekar brothers and Mahadeo Vinayak Ranade, who are later caught and hanged.
Lt. Gen. Arsenio Linares y Pombo of the Spanish Army outnumbers them two-to-one, but does not oppose the landings.

1901–present
1907 – The London Underground's Charing Cross, Euston and Hampstead Railway opens.
1911 – George V and Mary of Teck are crowned King and Queen of the United Kingdom of Great Britain and Ireland.
  1911   – Mexican Revolution: Government forces bring an end to the Magonista rebellion of 1911 in the Second Battle of Tijuana.
1918 – The Hammond Circus Train Wreck kills 86 and injures 127 near Hammond, Indiana.
1940 – World War II: France is forced to sign the Second Compiègne armistice with Germany, in the same railroad car in which the Germans signed the Armistice in 1918.
1941 – World War II: Nazi Germany invades the Soviet Union in Operation Barbarossa.
1942 – World War II: Erwin Rommel is promoted to Field Marshal after the Axis capture of Tobruk.
  1942   – The Pledge of Allegiance is formally adopted by US Congress.
1944 – World War II: Opening day of the Soviet Union's Operation Bagration against the Army Group Centre.
  1944   – U.S. President Franklin D. Roosevelt signs into law the Servicemen's Readjustment Act of 1944, commonly known as the G.I. Bill.
1945 – World War II: The Battle of Okinawa comes to an end. 
1948 – The ship  brought the first group of 802 West Indian immigrants to Tilbury, marking the start of modern immigration to the United Kingdom.
  1948   – King George VI formally gives up the title "Emperor of India", half a year after Britain actually gave up its rule of India. 
1962 – Air France Flight 117 crashes on approach to Pointe-à-Pitre International Airport in Guadeloupe, killing 112 people. 
1965 – The Treaty on Basic Relations between Japan and the Republic of Korea is signed.
1966 – Vietnamese Buddhist activist leader Thích Trí Quang was arrested as the military junta of Nguyen Cao Ky crushed the Buddhist Uprising.
1969 – The Cuyahoga River catches fire in Cleveland, Ohio, drawing national attention to water pollution, and spurring the passing of the Clean Water Act and the creation of the Environmental Protection Agency.
1978 – Charon, the first of Pluto's satellites to be discovered, was first seen at the United States Naval Observatory by James W. Christy.
 1979 – Former Liberal Party leader Jeremy Thorpe was acquitted of conspiracy to murder Norman Scott, who had accused Thorpe of having a relationship with him. 
1984 – Virgin Atlantic launches with its first flight from London to Newark.
1986 – The famous Hand of God goal, scored by Diego Maradona in the quarter-finals of the 1986 FIFA World Cup match between Argentina and England, ignites controversy. This was later followed by the Goal of the Century. Argentina wins 2–1 and later goes on to win the World Cup.
1990 – Cold War: Checkpoint Charlie is dismantled in Berlin.
2000 – Wuhan Airlines Flight 343 is struck by lightning and crashes into Wuhan's Hanyang District, killing 49 people.
2002 – An earthquake measuring 6.5 Mw strikes a region of northwestern Iran killing at least 261 people and injuring 1,300 others and eventually causing widespread public anger due to the slow official response.
2009 – A Washington D.C Metro train traveling southbound near Fort Totten station collides into another train waiting to enter the station. Nine people are killed in the collision (eight passengers and the train operator) and at least 80 others are injured.
2012 – Paraguayan President Fernando Lugo is removed from office by impeachment and succeeded by Federico Franco.
  2012   – A Turkish Air Force McDonnell Douglas F-4 Phantom II fighter plane is shot down by the Syrian Armed Forces, killing both of the plane's pilots and worsening already-strained relations between Turkey and Syria.
2015 – The Afghan National Assembly building is attacked by gunmen after a suicide bombing. All six of the gunmen are killed and 18 people are injured.
2022 – An earthquake occurs in eastern Afghanistan resulting in over 1,000 deaths.

Births

Pre-1600
 662 – Rui Zong, emperor of the Tang Dynasty (d. 716)
 916 – Sayf al-Dawla, founder of the Emirate of Aleppo (d. 967)
1000 – Robert I, duke of Normandy (d. 1035)
1373 – Elizabeth Bonifacia, heiress of Poland (d. 1399)
1427 – Lucrezia Tornabuoni, Italian writer and wife of Piero di Cosimo de' Medici (d. 1482)
1450 – Eleanor of Naples, duchess of Ferrara (d. 1493)
1477 – Thomas Grey, 2nd Marquess of Dorset, English nobleman (d. 1530)
1593 – Sir John Gell, 1st Baronet, English landowner and Parliamentarian commander (d. 1671)

1601–1900
1680 – Ebenezer Erskine, Scottish minister and theologian (d. 1754).
1684 – Francesco Manfredini, Italian violinist and composer (d. 1762)
1704 – John Taylor, English author and scholar (d. 1766)
1713 – John Sackville, English cricketer and politician (d. 1765)
1738 – Jacques Delille, French poet and translator (d. 1813).
1757 – George Vancouver, English lieutenant and explorer (d. 1798).
1763 – Étienne Méhul, French pianist and composer (d. 1817).
1767 – Wilhelm von Humboldt, German philosopher, academic, and politician, Interior Minister of Prussia (d. 1835).
1792 – James Beaumont Neilson, Scottish engineer and businessman (d. 1865)
1805 – Giuseppe Mazzini, Italian journalist and politician (d. 1872).
1820 – James Hutchison Stirling, Scottish physician and philosopher (d. 1909).
1834 – William Chester Minor, American surgeon and linguist (d. 1920)
1837 – Paul Morphy, American chess player (d. 1884)
  1837   – Ernst Ziller, German-Greek architect, designed the Presidential Mansion (d. 1923)
1844 – Oscar von Gebhardt, German theologian and academic (d. 1906)
1845 – Tom Dula, American soldier (d. 1868)
  1845 – Richard Seddon, English-New Zealand politician, 15th Prime Minister of New Zealand (d. 1906).
  1850 – Ignác Goldziher, Hungarian scholar of Islam (d. 1921).
1855 – Samuel Morris, Australian cricketer (d. 1931)
1856 – Henry Rider Haggard, English novelist (d. 1925).
1861 – Maximilian von Spee, Danish-German admiral (d. 1914)
1864 – Hermann Minkowski, German mathematician and academic (d. 1909)
1871 – William McDougall, English psychologist and polymath (d. 1938)
1873 – Filippo Silvestri, Italian entomologist and academic (d. 1949)
1874 – Walter Friedrich Otto, German philologist and scholar (d. 1958)
1876 – Pascual Díaz y Barreto, Mexican archbishop (d. 1936) 
1879 – Thibaudeau Rinfret, Canadian lawyer and jurist, 9th Chief Justice of Canada (d. 1962)
1880 – Johannes Drost, Dutch swimmer (d. 1954)
1884 – James Rector, American sprinter and lawyer (d. 1949)
1885 – Milan Vidmar, Slovenian engineer and chess player (d. 1962)
1887 – Julian Huxley, English biologist and academic (d. 1975)
1888 – Harold Hitz Burton, American lawyer and politician, 45th Mayor of Cleveland (d. 1964)
1889 – Joseph Cohen, British solicitor, property developer, cinema magnate and Jewish community leader (d. 1980)
1890 – Aleksander Warma, Estonian commander and politician, 4th Prime Minister of Estonia in exile (d. 1970)
1891 – Franz Alexander, Hungarian psychoanalyst and physician (d. 1964)
1892 – Robert Ritter von Greim, German general and pilot (d. 1945)
1894 – Bernard Ashmole, English archaeologist and art historian (d. 1988)
1896 – Leonard W. Murray, Canadian admiral (d. 1971)
1897 – Edmund A. Chester, American journalist and broadcaster (d. 1973)
  1897   – Norbert Elias, German-Dutch sociologist and philosopher (d. 1990)
1898 – Erich Maria Remarque, German-Swiss soldier and author (d. 1970)
1899 – Richard Gurley Drew, American engineer, invented Masking tape (d. 1980)
  1899   – Michał Kalecki, Polish economist and academic (d. 1970)
1900 – Oskar Fischinger, German-American abstract artist, filmmaker, and painter (d. 1967)

1901–present
1901 – Elias Katz, Finnish runner and coach (d. 1947)
1902 – Marguerite De La Motte, American actress (d. 1950)
1903 – John Dillinger, American criminal (d. 1934)
  1903   – Carl Hubbell, American baseball player (d. 1988)
1906 – William Kneale, English logician and philosopher (d. 1990) 
  1906   – Anne Morrow Lindbergh, American pilot and author (d. 2001)
  1906   – Billy Wilder, Austrian-born American director, producer, and screenwriter (d. 2002)
1907 – Eriks Ādamsons, Latvian writer, poet, and novelist (d. 1946)
1909 – Katherine Dunham, American dancer and choreographer (d. 2006)
  1909   – Infanta Beatriz of Spain, Spanish aristocratic (d. 2002)
  1909   – Mike Todd, American producer and manager (d. 1958)
1910 – John Hunt, Baron Hunt, Indian-English lieutenant and mountaineer (d. 1998)
  1910   – Anne Ziegler, English singer (d. 2003)
  1910   – Konrad Zuse, German computer scientist and engineer, invented the Z3 computer (d. 1995)
1911 – Vernon Kirby, South African tennis player (d. 1994)
1912 – Princess Caroline Mathilde of Saxe-Coburg and Gotha (d. 1983)
  1912   – Raymonde Allain, French model and actress (d. 2008)
1913 – Sándor Weöres, Hungarian poet and author (d. 1989)
1914 – Mei Zhi, Chinese author and essayist (d. 2004)
1915 – Dolf van der Linden, Dutch conductor and composer (d. 1999)
  1915   – Cornelius Warmerdam, American pole vaulter and coach (d. 2001)
  1915   – Randolph Hokanson, American pianist (d. 2018)
  1915   – Thomas Quinn Curtiss, American writer, and film and theatre critic (d. 2000)
1916 – Johnny Jacobs, American television announcer (d. 1982)
  1916   – Richard Eastham, American actor (d. 2005)
  1916   – Emil Fackenheim, German Jewish philosopher and Reform rabbi (d. 2003)
1918 – Cicely Saunders, English nurse, social worker, physician and writer (d. 2005)
  1918   – Yeoh Ghim Seng, Singaporean politician, acting President of Singapore (d. 1993)
1919 – Gower Champion, American dancer and choreographer (d. 1980)
  1919   – Henri Tajfel, Polish social psychologist (d. 1982)
  1919   – Clifton McNeely, American basketball player and coach (d. 2003)
1920 – James H. Pomerene, American computer scientist and engineer (d. 2008)
  1920   – Jovito Salonga, Filipino lawyer and politician, 14th President of the Senate of the Philippines (d. 2016)
1921 – Joseph Papp, American director and producer (d. 1991)
  1921   – Barbara Vucanovich, American lawyer and politician (d. 2013)
  1921   – Radovan Ivšić, Croatian writer (d. 2009) 
  1921   – Barbara Perry, American actress (d. 2019)
1922 – Bill Blass, American fashion designer, founded Bill Blass Group (d. 2002)
  1922   – Clair Cameron Patterson, American scientist (d. 1995)
1923 – José Giovanni, French-Swiss director and screenwriter (d. 2004)
1924 – Christopher Booth, English clinician and historian (d. 2012)
  1924   – Larkin Kerwin, Canadian physicist and academic (d. 2004)
1926 – George Englund, American film editor, director, producer and actor (d. 2017)
  1926   – Rachid Solh, Lebanese politician, 48th Prime Minister of Lebanon (d. 2014)
1927 – Anthony Low, Indian-English historian and academic (d. 2015)
1928 – Ralph Waite, American actor and director (d. 2014)
1929 – Bruce Kent, English activist and laicised Roman Catholic priest (d. 2022)
1930 – Yuri Artyukhin, Russian colonel, engineer, and astronaut (d. 1998)
  1930   – Walter Bonatti, Italian journalist and mountaineer (d. 2011)
1931 – Ruby Garrard Woodson, American educator and cultural historian (d. 2008) 
1932 – Soraya Esfandiary-Bakhtiari, Princess of Iran (d. 2001)
  1932   – Yevgeny Kychanov, Russian orientalist, historian, and academic (d. 2013)
  1932   – Amrish Puri, Indian actor (d. 2005)
  1932   – June Salter, Australian actress (d. 2001)
  1932   – Prunella Scales, English actress
  1932   – John Wakeham, Baron Wakeham, English businessman and politician, Leader of the House of Lords
1933 – Dianne Feinstein, American politician
1934 – James Bjorken, American physicist, author, and academic
1936 – Kris Kristofferson, American singer-songwriter, guitarist, and actor 
  1936   – Ferran Olivella, Spanish footballer
  1936   – Hermeto Pascoal, Brazilian accordion player and composer
1937 – Chris Blackwell, English record producer, co-founded Island Records
  1937   – Bernie McGann, Australian saxophonist and composer (d. 2013)
1939 – Don Matthews, American-Canadian football player and coach (d. 2017)
  1939   – Ed Paschke, Polish-American painter and academic (d. 2004)
1940 – Joan Busfield, English sociologist, psychologist, and academic
  1940   – Hubert Chesshyre, English historian and author (d. 2020)
  1940   – Abbas Kiarostami, Iranian director, producer, and screenwriter (d. 2016)
  1940   – Esther Rantzen, English journalist
1941 – Ed Bradley, American journalist (d. 2006)
  1941   – Terttu Savola, Finnish journalist and politician
1943 – Klaus Maria Brandauer, Austrian actor and director
  1943   – Brit Hume, American journalist and author
  1943   – J. Michael Kosterlitz, British-American physicist 
1944 – Peter Asher, English singer, guitarist, and producer 
  1944   – Helmut Dietl, German director, producer, and screenwriter (d. 2015)
1945 – Rainer Brüderle, German economist and politician, German Minister of Economics and Technology
1946 – Linda Bond, Canadian 19th General of The Salvation Army
  1946   – Sheila Hollins, Baroness Hollins, English psychiatrist and academic
  1946   – Eliades Ochoa, Cuban singer-songwriter, guitarist, and producer 
  1946   – Józef Oleksy, Polish economist and politician, 7th Prime Minister of Poland (d. 2015)
  1946   – Stephen Waley-Cohen, English journalist and businessman
1947 – Octavia E. Butler, American author (d. 2006)
  1947   – Howard Kaylan, American pop-rock singer-songwriter and musician
  1947   – Bruno Latour, French philosopher, anthropologist and sociologist
  1947   – Pete Maravich, American basketball player (d. 1988)
  1947   – Jerry Rawlings, Ghanaian lieutenant and politician, President of Ghana (d. 2020)
1948 – James Charteris, 13th Earl of Wemyss, Scottish businessman
  1948   – Todd Rundgren, American singer-songwriter, guitarist, and producer 
1949 – Larry Junstrom, American bass player (d. 2019)
  1949   – Brian Leveson, English lawyer and judge
  1949   – Alan Osmond, American singer and producer 
  1949   – Meryl Streep, American actress
  1949   – Luís Filipe Vieira, Portuguese businessman
  1949   – Lindsay Wagner, American actress 
  1949   – Elizabeth Warren, American academic and politician
1950 – Sharon Maughan, English actress
  1950   – Adrian Năstase, Romanian lawyer and politician, 59th Prime Minister of Romania 
  1950   – Greg Oliphant, Australian rugby league player
  1950   – Zenonas Petrauskas, Lithuanian lawyer and politician (d. 2009)
  1950   – Tom Alter, Indian actor (d. 2017)
1951 – Brian Cookson, British cyclist and sports administrator
  1951   – Craig Gruber, American bass player (d. 2015)
  1951   – Humphrey Ocean, English painter and academic
1952 – Graham Greene, Canadian actor
  1952   – Santokh Singh, Malaysian football player
1953 – Wim Eijk, Dutch cardinal
  1953   – Mauro Francaviglia, Italian mathematician and academic (d. 2013)
  1953   – Cyndi Lauper, American singer-songwriter, producer, and actress 
  1953   – Bruce McAvaney, Australian journalist and sportscaster
1954 – Freddie Prinze, American comedian and actor (d. 1977)
1955 – Green Gartside, Welsh singer-songwriter and guitarist 
  1955   – Christine Orengo, British academic and educator
1956 – Darryl Brohman, Australian rugby league player and sportscaster
  1956   – Alfons De Wolf, Belgian cyclist
  1956   – Shah Mehmood Qureshi, Pakistani agriculturist and politician, 25th Pakistani Minister of Foreign Affairs
  1956   – Tim Russ, American actor, director, and screenwriter
  1956   – Markus Schatte, German footballer, manager, and coach
  1956   – Derek Forbes, Scottish bass player and guitarist 
1957 – Danny Baker, English journalist and screenwriter
  1957   – Garry Gary Beers, Australian bass player, songwriter, and producer
  1957   – Kevin Bond, English footballer and manager
  1957   – Michael Stratton, English geneticist and academic
1958 – Rocío Banquells, Mexican pop singer and actress
  1958   – Bruce Campbell, American actor, director, producer and writer
1959 – Michael Kinane, Irish jockey
  1959   – Nicola Sirkis, French singer-songwriter and guitarist 
  1959   – Daniel Xuereb, French footballer
1960 – Erin Brockovich, American lawyer and environmentalist
  1960   – Margrit Klinger, German runner
  1960   – Tracy Pollan, American actress
1961 – Jimmy Somerville, Scottish singer-songwriter 
1962 – Stephen Chow, Hong Kong actor, director, producer, and screenwriter
  1962   – Bobby Gillespie, Scottish musician and singer-songwriter
  1962   – Clyde Drexler, American basketball player and coach
  1962   – Gerald Hillringhaus, German footballer
1963 – Hokutoumi Nobuyoshi, Japanese sumo wrestler, the 61st Yokozuna
  1963   – John Tenta, Canadian-American wrestler (d. 2006)
1964 – Cadillac Anderson, American basketball player
  1964   – Amy Brenneman, American actress
  1964   – Dan Brown, American author and academic
  1964   – Miroslav Kadlec, Czech footballer 
1965 – Uwe Boll, German director, producer, and screenwriter
  1965   – Ľubomír Moravčík, Czech footballer and manager
1966 – Michael Park, English racing driver (d. 2005)
  1966   – Emmanuelle Seigner, French actress 
  1966   – Dean Woods, Australian cyclist
1968 – Darrell Armstrong, American basketball player and coach
  1968   – Miri Yu, Zainichi, Korean novelist
1971 – Gary Connolly, English rugby player
  1971   – Mary Lynn Rajskub, American actress and comedian
  1971   – Kurt Warner, American football player and sportscaster
1972 – Damien Oliver, Australian jockey
1973 – Carson Daly, American radio and television host 
1974 – Jo Cox, British MP (d. 2016)
  1974   – Vijay, Indian actor
1975 – Urmas Reinsalu, Estonian academic and politician, 28th Estonian Minister of Defence
1978 – Champ Bailey, American football player
  1978   – Dan Wheldon, English racing driver (d. 2011)
1979 – Joey Cheek, American speed skater
  1979   – Thomas Voeckler, French cyclist
1980 – Ilya Bryzgalov, Russian ice hockey player
  1980   – Stephanie Jacobsen, Hong Kong-Australian actress
1981 – Sione Lauaki, New Zealand rugby player (d. 2017)
  1981   – Aquivaldo Mosquera, Colombian footballer
1982 – Andoni Iraola, Spanish footballer
  1982   – Ian Kinsler, American baseball player
  1982   – Soraia Chaves, Portuguese actress and model
1983 – Allar Raja, Estonian rower
1984 – Dustin Johnson, American golfer
  1984   – Rubén Iván Martínez, Spanish footballer
  1984   – Jerome Taylor, Jamaican cricketer
  1984   – Janko Tipsarević, Serbian tennis player
1985 – Thomas Leuluai, New Zealand rugby league player
1987 – Danny Green, American basketball player
1987   – Lee Min-ho, South Korean actor, singer, model, creative director and businessman
  1987   – Nikita Rukavytsya, Ukrainian-Australian footballer
1988 – Omri Casspi, Israeli basketball player
1989 – Cédric Mongongu, Congolese footballer
  1989   – Jung Yong-hwa, South Korean singer-songwriter and actor
1990 – Sebastian Jung, German footballer
1991 – Hugo Mallo, Spanish footballer
1992 – Ura Kazuki, Japanese sumo wrestler
  1992   – Harry Reid, British actor
1993 – Loris Karius, German footballer
1994 – Sebastien Haller, French footballer
  1994   – Carlos Vinícius Santos de Jesus, Brazilian footballer
1996 – Mikel Merino, Spanish footballer
1999 – Sam Retford, Australian-English actor

Deaths

Pre-1600
 207 BC – Hasdrubal Barca, Carthaginian general in the Second Punic War (b. 245 BC)
 431 – Paulinus of Nola, Christian bishop and poet (b. 354)
 910 – Gebhard, Frankish nobleman
   910   – Gerhard I, Frankish nobleman
 947 – Qian Hongzuo, king of Wuyue (b. 928)
1017 – Leo Passianos, Byzantine general
1101 – Roger I of Sicily, Norman nobleman (b. 1031)
1276 – Innocent V, pope of the Catholic Church (b. 1225)
1343 – Aimone, Count of Savoy (b. 1291)
1429 – Jamshīd al-Kāshī, Persian astronomer and mathematician (b. 1380)
1521 – Leonardo Loredan, Italian politician, 76th Doge of Venice (b. 1436)
1535 – John Fisher, English bishop and saint (b. 1469)

1601–1900
1632 – James Whitelocke, English judge and politician, Chief Justice of Chester (b. 1570)
1634 – Johann von Aldringen, Austrian field marshal (b. 1588)
1664 – Katherine Philips, Anglo-Welsh poet (b. 1631)
1699 – Josiah Child, English merchant, economist, and politician (b. 1630)
1714 – Matthew Henry, Welsh minister and author (b. 1662)
1766 – Carlo Zimech, Maltese priest and painter (b. 1696)
1868 – Heber C. Kimball, American religious leader (b. 1801)
1872 – Rudecindo Alvarado, Argentinian general (b. 1792)
1874 – Howard Staunton, English chess player (b. 1810)
1892 – Pierre Ossian Bonnet, French mathematician and academic (b. 1819)
1894 – Alexandre-Antonin Taché, Canadian archbishop and missionary (b. 1823)

1901–present
1905 – Francis Lubbock, American colonel and politician, 9th Governor of Texas (b. 1815)
1913 – Ștefan Octavian Iosif, Romanian poet and translator (b. 1875)
1925 – Felix Klein, German mathematician and academic (b. 1849)
1928 – A. B. Frost, American illustrator and painter (b. 1851)
1931 – Armand Fallières, French politician, 9th President of France (b. 1841)
1933 – Tim Birkin, English racing driver and lieutenant (b. 1896)
1935 – Szymon Askenazy, Polish historian and diplomat (b. 1866)
1936 – Moritz Schlick, German-Austrian physicist and philosopher (b. 1882)
1938 – C. J. Dennis, Australian poet and author (b. 1876)
1940 – Monty Noble, Australian cricketer and sportscaster (b. 1873)
1942 – August Froehlich, German priest and activist (b. 1891)
1945 – Isamu Chō, Japanese general (b. 1895)
  1945   – Mitsuru Ushijima, Japanese general (b. 1887)
1956 – Walter de la Mare, English poet, short story writer and novelist (b. 1873)
1959 – Hermann Brill, German educator and politician, 8th Minister-President of Thuringia (b. 1895)
1964 – Havank, Dutch journalist and author (b. 1904)
1965 – David O. Selznick, American screenwriter and producer (b. 1902)
1966 – Thaddeus Shideler, American hurdler (b. 1883)
1969 – Judy Garland, American actress and singer (b. 1922)
1970 – Đặng Thùy Trâm, Vietnamese surgeon and author (b. 1942)
1974 – Darius Milhaud, French composer and educator (b. 1892)
1977 – Jacqueline Audry, French director and screenwriter (b. 1908)
  1977   – Peter Laughner, American singer-songwriter and guitarist (b. 1952)
1979 – Louis Chiron, Monégasque race car driver (b. 1899)
1980 – Joseph Cohen, British solicitor, property developer, cinema magnate and Jewish community leader (b. 1889)
1984 – Joseph Losey, American director, producer, and screenwriter (b. 1909)
1987 – Fred Astaire, American actor and dancer (b. 1899)
1988 – Dennis Day, American singer and actor (b. 1916)
1990 – Ilya Frank, Russian physicist and academic, Nobel Prize laureate (b. 1908)
1993 – Pat Nixon, American educator, 37th First Lady of the United States (b. 1912)
1995 – Leonid Derbenyov, Russian poet and songwriter (b. 1931)
  1995   – Al Hansen, American sculptor and author (b. 1927)
1997 – Ted Gärdestad, Swedish singer-songwriter (b. 1956)
  1997   – Gérard Pelletier, Canadian journalist and politician (b. 1919)
2003 – Vasil Bykaŭ, Belarusian war novelist (b. 1924)
2004 – Bob Bemer, American computer scientist and engineer (b. 1920)
  2004   – Mattie Stepanek, American poet and author (b. 1990)
2007 – Erik Parlevliet, Dutch field hockey player (b. 1964)
2008 – Natalia Bekhtereva, Russian neuroscientist and psychologist (b. 1924)
  2008   – George Carlin, American comedian, actor, and author (b. 1937)
  2008   – Dody Goodman, American actress and dancer (b. 1914)
2011 – Coşkun Özarı, Turkish footballer and coach (b. 1931)
2012 – Juan Luis Galiardo, Spanish actor and producer (b. 1922)
2013 – Henning Larsen, Danish architect, designed the Copenhagen Opera House (b. 1925)
  2013   – Allan Simonsen, Danish race car driver (b. 1978)
2014 – Fouad Ajami, Lebanese-American author and academic (b. 1945)
  2014   – Rama Narayanan, Indian director and producer (b. 1949)
2015 – James Horner, American composer and conductor (b. 1953)
2017 – Mao Kobayashi, Japanese newscaster and actress (b. 1982)
  2017   – Quett Masire, Botswanan politician (b. 1926)
2018 – Vinnie Paul, American musician (b. 1964)
2022 – Bruton Smith, American racetrack promoter (b. 1927)
  2022   – Yves Coppens, French anthropologist (b. 1934)

Holidays and observances
 Christian feast day:
 Aaron of Aleth
 Alban, first recorded Martyr in Britain (commemoration, Anglicanism)
 Blessed Pope Innocent V
 Eusebius of Samosata (Eastern Orthodox Church)
 John Fisher (Catholic Church)
 Nicetas of Remesiana
 Paulinus of Nola
 Thomas More (Catholic Church)
 June 22 (Eastern Orthodox liturgics)
 Anti-Fascist Struggle Day (Croatia)
 Day of Remembrance of the Victims of the Great Patriotic War (Belarus)
 Father's Day (Guernsey, Isle of Man, and Jersey)
 Teachers' Day (El Salvador)
 Windrush Day (UK)

References

External links

 
 
 

Days of the year
June